James Edward Adkins FRCO (14 Dec 1867 - 4 January 1939) was an Irish organist and composer.

Background

He was born on 14 December 1867 in Belfast, the son of James Adkins and Emma Ryan. He studied at the Royal College of Music  and trained at Ely Cathedral under the organist, Edmund Thomas Chipp.

He married Louisa Day on 29 July 1889 in Richmond Upon Thames. They had three children:
Edith Grace Adkins b.1890  
Edouardine Adkins b.1892  
James Francis Basil Adkins 1899 - 1917
Eric Alan Edward Adkins 1904 - 1982

His son James Francis Basil Adkins, a Private in the 2nd Battalion of the Suffolk Regiment, was killed in Flanders on 1 Oct 1917.

His other son Eric was also a fine musician. Both Basil and Eric were st Paul's Cathedral choir boys.

Whilst in Preston he was conductor of the Preston Amateur Operatic Society 1895 - 1901, Conductor of Chorley Choral Society, 1890 – 1891, and Conductor of Preston Choral Society, 1905 - 1907.

He died on 4 January 1939 in Amounderness, Lancashire.

Appointments

Organist at St. Anne's Church, Wandsworth 
Organist at All Saints' Church, Grosvenor Road, London 
Organist at St. Stephen's Church, East Twickenham 
Organist at St. George's Church, Esher 
Organist at Preston Parish Church 1890 – 1912

Publications

Preston Parish Church: its organists, choir, and organs, 1574-1915.

Compositions

He composed 
Magnificat and nunc dimittis in D 1898
Tears, idle Tears. Four-Part Song for mixed voices 1908 
Magnificat and nunc dimittis for men's voices 1910
Magnificat and nunc dimittis in G 1911 
Magnficat for treble voices 1911
Te Deum for treble voices 1911
Te Deum in G 1911
Jubilate in G 1911
Hibernia (Overture) Adagio & Allegretto from the Brandenburg Concerto No. 1. J. S. Bach. Arrangement 1923

References

1867 births
1939 deaths
Fellows of the Royal College of Organists
Classical organists from Northern Ireland
Musicians from Belfast
Male classical organists